Stane Šporn (born 1 April 1904, date of death unknown) was a Yugoslav long-distance runner. He competed in the marathon at the 1936 Summer Olympics.

References

1904 births
Year of death missing
Athletes (track and field) at the 1936 Summer Olympics
Slovenian male marathon runners
Yugoslav male marathon runners
Olympic athletes of Yugoslavia
Sportspeople from Ljubljana